Eli Janney may refer to:

 Eli H. Janney (1831–1912), American inventor of the Janney coupler used in rail transport
 Eli Janney (musician), American music producer and musician